The Troublemaker is a film directed by Theodore J. Flicker and starring Tom Aldredge and Joan Darling. It premiered at the Beekman Theater in New York City on June 22, 1964. Flicker co-wrote the script with Buck Henry; both men appear as actors in the film. The humor was based on The Premise, a Greenwich Village-based comedy troupe Flicker created that he and Henry both participated in.

Plot
Jack Armstrong (Tom Aldredge) gives up his career as a chicken farmer to open a coffee shop in Greenwich Village. Lawyer T. R. Kingston (Buck Henry) assists Jack in his endeavor, which becomes paying protection money to Sal Kelley (James Frawley) and other city officials. Soon, Jack and T.R. find themselves in a bit too deep, and are being chased down by the officials. Jack’s girlfriend Denver (Joan Darling) joins the mix, and the trio gets into all sorts of chaos.

Cast

The Premise 
The Premise was an improv group originally started by Flicker in 1960, where it performed in the Premise Theater in Greenwich Village.  The original members of the group were Flecker, George Segal, James Frawley, and Joan Darling - all of which, except George, made an appearance in The Troublemaker. Buck Henry joined the group later on. He discussed his experience in an interview with Bill Dana and Jenni Matz in 2005.

“...basically it was what all improvisational groups do. There were audience suggestions, about, just about everything. We did set pieces and audience suggestion pieces and then we always did one act based on the news, so that it, it was kind of new and fresh or at least seemed new and fresh, ‘cause they were formulae to get at various kinds of spoofing the news. But, but, you know, and the audience would suggest a movie or a year or a, a nationality or an event of some kind and we’d act it out. But we were determined to do it…”

A performance put on by The Premise is where Bill Dana first met Buck Henry, and got him onto The Steve Allen Show in 1961.

Production 
This film was shot on location in the West Village and Times Square in New York City. It was produced under Ozymandias Productions and Seneca Productions, and distributed through Janus Films.

The crew for this film includes Ben Berk (Assistant Director), Gayne Rescher (Director of Photography), Robert Gaffney (Producer), John McManus and William Austin (Film Editors), Cy Coleman (Music Composition and Conduction), David Moon (Art Director), Leif Pedersen (Set Decoration), Robert Maybaum (Sound), and Lewis Bushnell (Production Manager).

Critical reception
Bosley Crowther of The New York Times gave the film a mixed review. He applauded Flicker’s direction, but wasn’t charmed by the comedy of the film.

Despite not being a fan of the storyline or the jokes, Crowther admired the professionalism of the crew, which includes Gayne Rescher’s cinematography and Cy Coleman's music for the film.

In an obituary for director Flicker, Variety called Troublemaker an “indie cult classic”.

References

External links 

1964 films
1964 comedy films
1964 directorial debut films
Films set in New York City
Films shot in New York City
Films with screenplays by Buck Henry
Films directed by Theodore J. Flicker
Films scored by Cy Coleman
1960s English-language films